Alexander Coxon (18 January 1916 – 22 January 2006) was an English cricketer who played for Yorkshire. He also played one Test match for England in 1948.

Life and career
Coxon was born in Huddersfield, Yorkshire. World War II delayed Coxon's first-class debut for Yorkshire to 1945, when he was 29. Coxon was an aggressive fast-medium bowler who played for England once – against Australia in 1948 at Lord's. There were rumours of an argument with Denis Compton, and his prickly nature was later attested to by Brian Close. Coxon retired after the 1950 season, allegedly in umbrage at his non-selection for the forthcoming Ashes tour, and moved to play Minor counties cricket with Durham. He played 29 times for that county between 1951 and 1954, taking 127 wickets and scoring 1,047 runs with two centuries. His highest score was 102 not out against Yorkshire Second XI at Scarborough in 1952. Also in 1952, he achieved his best bowling figures for Durham; nine for 28 and six for 58 against Staffordshire.

He also played professionally with Sunderland, where he took 753 wickets at 8.73 runs apiece, and scored 3,764 runs at an average of 34.21.

In 1959, he moved to South Shields where he took 443 wickets for 10.28 and scored 2,663 runs at 23.63. He had shorter spells with both Wearmouth and Bolden, before finally retiring from the sport some distance past his 50th birthday, although still coaching at Whitburn Cricket Club in 1979.

He also played soccer for Bradford Park Avenue A.F.C. in wartime matches. He kept up a keen interest in club cricket until the end.

References

External links
A profile of Alec Coxon by Dave Liverman Cricket Society Autumn 2008
Cricinfo page on Alec Coxon
CricketArchive page on Alec Coxon

1916 births
2006 deaths
England Test cricketers
English cricketers
Yorkshire cricketers
Durham cricketers
Cricketers from Huddersfield
English cricketers of 1946 to 1968
H. D. G. Leveson Gower's XI cricketers